Djupedalia is an extinct genus of cryptoclidid plesiosauroid plesiosaur known from the uppermost Jurassic of central Spitsbergen, Norway. It is named after Øystein Djupedal, the former Minister of Education and Research who helped fund the fossil excavation with a budget of 1.2 million Norwegian kroner.

See also 
 List of plesiosaur genera
 Timeline of plesiosaur research

References 

Cryptoclidids
Tithonian life
Late Jurassic plesiosaurs of Europe
Jurassic Norway
Fossils of Svalbard
Agardhfjellet Formation
Fossil taxa described in 2012
Sauropterygian genera